San Pablo, officially the City of San Pablo, is a 1st class component city in the province of Laguna, Philippines. According to the 2020 census, it has a population of 285,348 people.

It is located in the southern portion of Laguna province, it is one of the oldest cities in the Philippines. By land area, it is the largest in the province of Laguna. Its population ranks sixth within the province after the cities of Calamba, Santa Rosa, Biñan, San Pedro, and Cabuyao.

The city is also known as the "City of Seven Lakes", referring to the Seven Lakes of San Pablo: Lake Sampaloc (or Sampalok), Lake Palakpakin, Lake Bunot, Lakes Pandin and Yambo, Lake Muhikap, and Lake Calibato.

San Pablo was part of the Roman Catholic Archdiocese of Lipa since 1910. On November 28, 1967, it became an independent diocese and became the Roman Catholic Diocese of San Pablo.

History
San Pablo's earliest historical record dates back to pre-Spanish times when four large barrios bounded by Mount Makiling composed "Sampalok". In 1571, the first Spanish troops under Captain Juan de Salcedo arrived in the upland village of Sampaloc, which became a parish in 1586, and then a municipality in 1647, and was renamed "San Pablo de Los Montes" in honor of Saint Paul the First Hermit. In 1756, it was placed under the jurisdiction of Batangas province but was returned in 1883 to Laguna.

In 1899, a municipal government was established, with Atty. Innocente Martinez as municipal president. Marcos Paulino was elected municipal president in 1902 when the civil government was set up. From 1926 to 1940, the people of San Pablo worked for its independence from the province of Laguna. On May 7, 1940, the Charter Bill sponsored by Assemblyman Tomas D. Dizon of Laguna's 1st district was approved by President Manuel L. Quezon. The bill became known as the City Charter of San Pablo or Commonwealth Act No. 520 – approved by President Quezon.

The city was inaugurated on March 30, 1941, with Dr. Potenciano Malvar, a former governor of Laguna, as the city mayor appointed by president Manuel L. Quezon. Succeeding him 1941 as an appointed mayor was Dr. Manuel Quisumbing, in turn followed by Tomas D. Dizon in 1943 as an appointed mayor. The succeeding mayors were elected after 1955, with Cipriano B. Colago being the first elected city mayor.

Geography
San Pablo has a cool climate owing to its location. It is nestled in the foothills of three mountains: Mount Banahaw, Mount Makiling and the Sierra Madre Mountains. These mountains do not only provide attractions for the tourism industry (such as waterfalls) and sources of many forest-based products, but also serve as stewards for the clean air.

Its soil is suitable for those seeking opportunities in agriculture and horticulture given its richness and fertility. The different barangays have coconut plantation, lanzones fruit – Lansium parasiticum tree plantation and rambutan fruit tree plantation – Rambutan. The place is rich in orchid plants.

Climate 
The prevailing climatic conditions in the city is categorized into wet and dry seasons.

Barangays
San Pablo City is politically subdivided into 80 barangays.

 I-A (Sambat)
 I-B (City+Riverside)
 I-C (Bagong Bayan)
 II-A (Triangulo)
 II-B (Guadalupe)
 II-C (Unson)
 II-D (Bulante)
 II-E (San Anton)
 II-F (Villa Rey)
 III-A (Hermanos Belen)
 III-B
 III-C (Labak/De Roma)
 III-D (Villongco)
 III-E
 III-F (Balagtas)
 IV-A
 IV-B
 IV-C
 V-A
 V-B
 V-C
 V-D
 VI-A (Mavenida)
 VI-B
 VI-C (Bagong Pook)
 VI-D (Lparkers)
 VI-E (YMCA)
 VII-A (P.Alcantara)
 VII-B
 VII-C
 VII-D
 VII-E
 Atisan
 Bautista
 Concepcion (Bunot)
 Del Remedio (Wawa)
 Dolores
 San Antonio 1 (Balanga)
 San Antonio 2 (Sapa)
 San Bartolome (Matang-ag)
 San Buenaventura (Palakpakin)
 San Crispin (Lumbangan)
 San Cristobal
 San Diego (Tiim)
 San Francisco (Calihan)
 San Gabriel (Butucan)
 San Gregorio
 San Ignacio
 San Isidro (Balagbag)
 San Joaquin
 San Jose (Malamig)
 San Juan
 San Lorenzo (Saluyan)
 San Lucas 1 (Malinaw)
 San Lucas 2
 San Marcos (Tikew)
 San Mateo
 San Miguel
 San Nicolas
 San Pedro
 San Rafael (Magampon)
 San Roque (Buluburan)
 San Vicente
 Santa Ana
 Santa Catalina (Sandig)
 Santa Cruz (Putol)
 Santa Elena
 Santa Filomena (Banlagin)
 Santa Isabel
 Santa Maria
 Santa Maria Magdalena (Boe)
 Santa Monica
 Santa Veronica (Bae)
 Santiago I (Bulaho)
 Santiago II
 Santisimo Rosario
 Santo Angel (Ilog)
 Santo Cristo
 Santo Niño (Arsum)
 Soledad (Macopa)

Demographics

According to the 2010 census, San Pablo had a population of 248,890 people, up from 237,259 people and 44,166 households in the 2007 census. The city was once the largest city in Laguna, but it was overtaken by Calamba in the 1990 census. San Pedro followed suit in 1995, then came Santa Rosa and Biñan in 2007, and Cabuyao in 2015, all owing their growth to its proximity to Metro Manila.

Ethnicity and language
The language spoken in the city and the medium of instruction in schools are English and Filipino, also known as Tagalog in this area.

Economy 

At the end of the 20th century and the start of the 21st century, economic development shifted from San Pablo to western Laguna. San Pedro, Biñan, Santa Rosa, Cabuyao, Calamba, Los Baños, and Santa Cruz experienced rapid economic development brought about by local and foreign investments, the rapid growth of industrial estates and export processing zones, and the placement of major institutions in those areas, San Pablo City was left behind and remained a semi-developed residential community.

Despite the fact that the city was partly touched by economic development, San Pablo City boasts itself as a potential eco-tourism destination in the province. However, given its human and land resources, various BPO companies are seriously looking at developing the city into the ICT hub of Southern Luzon. Although there were previous attempts to build a similar establishment, SM Prime Holdings was given its go signal in July 2008 to push ahead for SM City San Pablo located at Riverina Commercial Estates along Maharlika Highway at Barangay San Rafael.

Apart from this, the development of the Hacienda Escudero plantation resort town and nearby real estates, which is a joint venture with Landco, is by far the largest planned community investment in the city covering : It will include resort type communities; the original Villa Escudero Plantations as the center-piece; commercial establishments like a mall, hotels, and a convention center to be built relative to the distinctive architecture theme of the original Villa Escudero. As such Hacienda Escudero will become the ultimate history town themed community in this part of the country.

ABS-CBN TV-46 San Pablo (DWLY-TV) served the city through its office along Rizal Avenue at the heart of the city until the Duterte government, shut down the operations of the broadcaster and revoked its franchise.

San Pablo City is home to showrooms, marketing, and parts/servicing centers of Ford, Geely, Hino, Honda, Hyundai, Isuzu, Kia San Pablo, MG, Mitsubishi, Nissan and Toyota.

San Pablo also claims the title City of Buko Pie Buko Pie", although other neighboring towns are also known for producing the delicacy. "Colettes' Buko Pie", based in San Pablo, was known for experimenting with different variants of the delicacy. Colette's has also regularly produced the "World's Largest Buko Pie" during San Pablo's Coco Festival. Colette's is the largest Buko Pie brand in the Laguna area with 34 stores. The supply of coconut in San Pablo makes it an ideal spot for putting up buko pie shops.

Franklin Baker Company, one of the well-known companies with operations in San Pablo, has announced that its plant in the city would cease its operations and transfer to another existing facility, owned by the said company, in Davao del Sur by December 2008. The said decision could affect the jobs of at least 1,200 people, the majority of them San Pableños. Various factors are blamed for this closure, including the conversion of big coconut farms into residential areas. However, production was restored in the first quarter of 2009 in the San Pablo plant of Franklin Baker Company due to processing problems encountered at Davao del Sur.

Tourism and recreation
The Seven Lakes of San Pablo, seven crater lakes scattered around the city, have for many generations provided food and livelihood, leisure and respite for the citizens of the city. A bustling city of trade and commerce, it is also a center of education and learning with schools, colleges, and training institutions.

 Lake Sampaloc, located behind the City Hall, is the youngest crater lake in the San Pablo volcanic field and the largest of the city's seven lakes – Seven Lakes of San Pablo.
 Lake Bunot (Coconut husk Lake)
 Lake Calibato
 Twin Lakes – Lakes Pandin and Yambo
 Lake Palakpakin
 Lake Muhikap

Hacienda Escudero Plantation Resort Town is the largest planned community investment in the city covering . The resort has the richness of coconut plantation, and provides serenading Filipino songs and Bayanihan Dances (Folk Dances).

Public Playground and Sampalok Lake (Katuparan ng Pangarap: Fulfillment of Dreams) is a public playground in the city built during the term of mayor Atty. Zacarias Africa Ticzon, who as well improved tourism places around Lake Sampaloc, that is near the municipal City Hall. Both places serve as haven for sports, and recreation. The vicinity for tourism consequently encouraged small businesses for restaurants of native dishes catering visitors of the area. It has dramatically contributed income for the city.

The Komikero Komiks Museum, a brick-and-mortar museum meant to showcase the Philippines' rich history of graphic novels and comic books, and the talent of eminent artists in the field, features original art from Philippine comic book industry leaders including Alfredo Alcala, Francisco Coching, Alex Niño, Steve Gan, Nestor Redondo, Tony Velasquez, Hal Santiago, and Gerry Alanguilan.  Alanguilan himself curated the museum until his death in 2019.

Government

Elected officials
City council (2022-2025):
 Mayor: Vicente B. Amante (Nacionalista Party)
 Vice Mayor: Justin G. Colago (Nacionalista Party)
 City Councilors:
 Angelita E. Yang (Nacionalista Party)
 Karla Monica Adajar-Lajara (Nacionalista Party)
 Carmela A. Acebedo (Nacionalista Party)
 Diosdado A. Biglete (Nacionalista Party)
 Martin Angelo B. Adriano, Jr. (Lakas-CMD)
 Plaridel G. Dela Cruz (Nacionalista Party)
 Elsie Pavico (Nacionalista Party)
 Buhay D. Espiritu (Independent)
 Napoleon C. Calatraba (Nacionalista Party)
 Dandi C. Medina (Nacionalista Party)

List of former municipal executives

Appointed

Elected

Infrastructure

Healthcare
Most of the large hospitals in San Pablo are located in the city proper, but there are also health centers built for each barangay in San Pablo. Notable hospitals and medical centers are shown below.
-Community General Hospital of San Pablo City (C. Colago Ave.)
– San Pablo Colleges Medical Center (Barangay San Rafael)
– San Pablo City Doctors' Hospital (A. Mabini Street)
– Laguna Provincial Hospital San Pablo (Gen. Luna St.)

Transportation
San Pablo city is along the Maharlika Highway which leads to Quezon province. Jeepneys connect San Pablo city proper with nearby Calauan and Rizal, as well as other cities like Tanauan, Santo Tomas, and Calamba. It is also served by vans heading to the cities of Lipa and Santa Rosa.

Philippine National Railways has a station for its southern main line near the city proper.

Utilities
San Pablo's water source is run by its own San Pablo City Water District and is assisted by NAWASA. Just like every other place in Southern Tagalog, San Pablo's electricity is run by Meralco.

Telecommunications
Citizens of San Pablo mainly use PLDT (including Smart), Globe, and Dito Telecommunity, although some may use other internet service providers. Texting stations are often found in retail stores, stands, and residential houses.

Notable personalities

Cynthia Barker, English politician and former mayor of Hertsmere, England.
Alexander Gesmundo, 27th Chief Justice of the Supreme Court of the Philippines
Arturo Brion, 161th Associate Justice of the Supreme Court.
Liza Maza, former Gabriela Partylist and Bayan Muna Partylist Representative
Celso Al. Carunungan,  writer, novelist, and film scriptwriter
Gerry Alanguilan,  a.k.a. "Komikero," comic book artist and writer best known for his graphic novels Wasted and Elmer.
Bayani Casimiro, tap dancer
Edgar Calabia Samar, poet and fictionist.
Jay Arcilla, actor and StarStruck Avenger in the 5th season of StarStruck.
Jiggy Manicad, television news producer/reporter and newscaster.
Flor Contemplacion, domestic worker
Sol Aragones, former news anchor reporter of ABS-CBN;  politician.
Roberta Angela Tamondong, model, beauty pageant titleholder, and Bb. Pilipinas Grand International 2022
Flor Ramos Contemplacion, Filipina domestic helper executed in Singapore after being convicted of murder

References

External links

 Official Website of San Pablo City, Laguna, Philippines
 San Pablo City
 [ Philippine Standard Geographic Code]
 Philippine Census Information
 Local Governance Performance Management System

 
Cities in Laguna (province)
Populated places established in 1647
1647 establishments in the Philippines
Component cities in the Philippines